Zhao Dezun (1913 – February 1, 2012) was a People's Republic of China politician. He was born in Liaozhong County, Fengtian Province (now part of Shenyang, Liaoning Province). He was Communist Party of China Committee Secretary and Governor of Heilongjiang Province.

1913 births
2012 deaths
CCP committee secretaries of Heilongjiang
Chinese Communist Party politicians from Liaoning
Delegates to the 7th National Congress of the Chinese Communist Party
Governors of Heilongjiang
People's Republic of China politicians from Liaoning
Politicians from Shenyang